Gerhard Aßmus (born 25 September 1928) is a German former sports shooter. He competed in the trap event at the 1960 Summer Olympics.

References

External links
 

1928 births
Possibly living people
People from Leipzig (district)
German male sport shooters
Sportspeople from Saxony
Olympic shooters of the United Team of Germany
Shooters at the 1960 Summer Olympics